() is a baseball stadium located in Tokorozawa, Saitama, Japan. It is home to the Saitama Seibu Lions, a professional baseball team.

The stadium has a roof over the field and the stands, like other indoor ballparks. However, it lacks a wall behind the stands so that natural air comes into the field. This makes it possible for home runs to leave the stadium, something not possible in typical domed stadiums.

The stadium was built in 1979 without the roof and named  as the new home field of the Lions that moved from Fukuoka to Tokorozawa that year. Initially an open air stadium, the installation of its roof took place in two phases: the first phase after the 1997 season, and the second phase after the 1998 seasons. At the beginning of the 1998 season, the stadium was renamed Seibu Dome although the domed roof had not completed yet.

Originally, the Lions had planned to build a new stadium in Odaiba, but due to requiring to get approval from the three other Tokyo-based teams at the time (the Nippon-Ham Fighters, the Yomiuri Giants, and the Yakult Swallows), opposition from local fans, and the cost to build a new stadium, they decided to just add a roof to the stadium.

On March 1, 2005, the stadium was named  as Invoice Inc. bought the naming rights of the stadium for the next two seasons.

Although Seibu Dome was still the official name of the stadium, the stadium and media used the sponsored name almost exclusively during this period. However, at the end of 2007, Goodwill's naming rights for both the stadium and team were seized due to Goodwill's illegal business movements. The dome's name was restored to Seibu Dome in 2008. On January 16, 2017, MetLife, a New York City-based financial institution, purchased naming rights for five years. On March 1, 2022, Belluna, a mail order company out of Ageo City, Saitama Prefecture, bought the naming rights to the stadium after MetLife's naming right deal expired.

The stadium is located in front of Seibukyūjō-mae Station, the terminal station of the Seibu Sayama Line railway (a branch of the Seibu Ikebukuro Line connecting Tokorozawa with Tokyo) and the Seibu Yamaguchi Line people mover. Both lines are operated by Seibu Railway, the owner of the stadium and the Lions.

Queen performed at the stadium for their Hot Space Tour in 1982. New Japan Pro-Wrestling held the finals of the 2014 G1 Climax on August 10, 2014, at the arena.

References

External links

MetLife Dome at Seibu Lions Official Site

Covered stadiums in Japan
Nippon Professional Baseball venues
MetLife
Seibu Lions
Saitama Seibu Lions
Buildings and structures in Tokorozawa, Saitama
Sports venues in Saitama Prefecture
Sports venues completed in 1979
1979 establishments in Japan